Ongar may refer to:

Essex, England
Ongar, Essex, a civil parish
Chipping Ongar, a town
Ongar railway station, a former London Underground station
Hundred of Ongar, an ancient administrative unit
High Ongar, a village in Essex

Other uses
Ongar, Dublin, Ireland
Ongar, Sindh, an archaeological site in Pakistan
Ileana Ongar (born 1950), Italian Olympic hurdler

See also
 Onga (disambiguation)